Corporal Bryan James Budd,  (16 July 1977 – 20 August 2006) was a British Army soldier and a Northern Irish recipient of the Victoria Cross (VC), the highest award for gallantry in the face of the enemy that can be awarded to British and Commonwealth forces.

Budd was a corporal in the 3rd Battalion, Parachute Regiment, when he was killed while on active service during Operation Herrick in Afghanistan. Budd died of injuries sustained during a fire fight with Taliban forces in Sangin, Helmand Province, from a bullet probably fired from a NATO weapon. The incident occurred whilst he was on a routine patrol close to the District Centre. He was the 20th UK serviceman to die in Afghanistan since the start of operations in November 2001. On 14 December 2006, it was announced by the Ministry of Defence that Budd would be posthumously awarded the Victoria Cross, only the 13th award of the medal since the end of the Second World War.

Early life
 Budd had been in the British Army for ten years, serving with the elite Pathfinder Platoon, which carries out reconnaissance deep behind enemy lines. As part of the Pathfinders, he served in many operational theatres including the former Yugoslavia, Sierra Leone, Afghanistan and Iraq.

In May 2002, Budd passed his section commander's battle course with distinction, and was due to be promoted to platoon sergeant. He was a qualified combat survival instructor, rock climber and free-fall parachutist. He was posted to the Army Foundation College in Harrogate in 2004, where he trained young soldiers.

In June 2006, Budd joined A Company, 3 PARA as part of the 3,600-strong British task force. Posted to Afghanistan, A Company, 3 PARA was based in the southern Afghanistan town of Sangin in Helmand Province.

Due to come home on 25 August 2006, Budd was killed on 20 August defending his section against heavy Taliban attack outside Sangin, allowing the section to return to safety. His body was recovered an hour later, and he was confirmed dead. Budd's commanding officer, Lieutenant Colonel Stuart Tootal, described Budd at the time of his death as "an outstanding leader" who had a professional manner "that inspired confidence in all that worked with him". Tootal said: "Bryan died doing the job he loved, leading his men from the front, where he always was. He was proud to call himself a paratrooper and we were proud to stand beside him."

On 14 December 2006, the Ministry of Defence confirmed the award of the VC, the first posthumous VC awarded since the Falklands War of 1982. Budd's widow, Lorena, collected the VC from Buckingham Palace on 7 March 2007.

A new Physical and Recreational Training Centre at Colchester Garrison was named the Corporal Budd VC Gymnasium on its opening on 4 July 2008.

First cited incident
In the first incident, on 27 July 2006, while on a routine patrol, Budd's section identified and engaged two enemy gunmen on the roof of a building in the centre of Sangin. During the ensuing fierce fire-fight, two of Budd's section were hit. One was seriously injured and collapsed in the open ground, where he remained exposed to enemy fire, with rounds striking the ground around him. Budd realised that he needed to regain the initiative and that the enemy needed to be driven back so that the casualty could be evacuated.

Under fire, he personally led the attack on the building where the enemy fire was heaviest, forcing the remaining fighters to flee across an open field where they were successfully engaged. This courageous and prompt action proved decisive in breaking the enemy and was undertaken at great personal risk. Budd's decisive leadership and conspicuous gallantry allowed his wounded colleague to be evacuated to safety where he subsequently received life-saving treatment.

Death
On 20 August 2006, A Company, 3 PARA was located in the southern Afghanistan town of Sangin. Budd and his platoon were ordered to hold a small, isolated coalition outpost – dubbed a platoon house – to protect engineers blowing holes in a compound 500 metres away. The site was subject to almost daily Taliban onslaught for months.

On the day, there were three sections on patrol, a total of 24 men, spread out in a head-high cornfield around the compound. Budd spotted four Taliban approaching, at a distance of 50 metres. With hand signals, Budd led his section in a flanking manoeuvre round to the cornfield's outskirts to try to cut them off, but they were spotted and the Taliban opened fire on the troops. A further group of Taliban opened up fire from a wall further back. The British soldiers took heavy fire, kneeling or lying down trying to take cover. One soldier received a bullet in the shoulder, and another was shot in the nose.

Realising his section were taking heavy fire and were likely to be killed, Budd got up and rushed straight through the corn in the direction of the Taliban, now just 20 metres away. Budd opened up on them in fully automatic mode with his rifle, and contact was immediately lost, but the Taliban fire lessened and allowed the rest of his section to withdraw back to safety so the casualties could be treated.

After withdrawal, Budd was declared missing in action and most of A Company was sent back to find him. Apache and Harrier air support was called in to beat the Taliban back. An hour later, Budd was found beside three dead Taliban.

Corporal Andy Waddington's section of men pushed forward through the cornfield and discovered and extracted Budd, who was badly wounded and had no pulse. Budd was declared dead on arrival at the platoon house.

Budd's Victoria Cross is displayed at the Parachute Regiment and Airborne Forces Museum at the Imperial War Museum Duxford, Cambridgeshire, in England.

Personal life
Budd was married to Lorena Budd, a clerk in 5 Regiment, Royal Artillery at Catterick, North Yorkshire. The couple had two daughters, Isabelle (born 2004), and Imogen, born a month after Budd died in Afghanistan. In addition to his twin he also has a brother and sister.

Awards
Budd had been awarded a number of military decorations and service medals. These include:

  Victoria Cross

 General Service Medal
 NATO Medal – Kosovo
 NATO Medal – Macedonia
 OSM "Sierra Leone"
 OSM "Afghanistan"
 Iraq Medal
 Golden Jubilee Medal

His official VC citation reads;

See also
British Forces casualties in Afghanistan since 2001

References

External links

1977 births
2006 deaths
War in Afghanistan (2001–2021) recipients of the Victoria Cross
British Parachute Regiment soldiers
British recipients of the Victoria Cross
Irish recipients of the Victoria Cross
Military personnel from Belfast
British military personnel of the Sierra Leone Civil War
British Army personnel of the War in Afghanistan (2001–2021)
British military personnel killed in the War in Afghanistan (2001–2021)
Twins from Northern Ireland
British Army recipients of the Victoria Cross